Mariveles Coal-Fired Power Plant is a coal power plant in Mariveles, Bataan. The 600-MW facility was connected to the Luzon power grid on January 21, 2013. The facility was a joint project of GN Power Mariveles Coal Plant Ltd Co. and AC Energy.

Two additional units are under construction, both with 600-MW capacity. It was scheduled in early 2016 that the construction of the first unit which would cost P1 billion would commence.

Aboitiz Power Corporation (AP), through their wholly-owned subsidiary Therma Power, Inc. acquired 66.1 percent ownership interest. It was completed on December 27, 2016.

References

External links

 Official website

Coal-fired power stations in the Philippines
Buildings and structures in Bataan
Energy infrastructure completed in 2013
21st-century architecture in the Philippines